Golestan National Park, commonly known as the Golestan Jungle, is an Iranian National Park in Golestan Province, northeastern Iran.

Geography
The park is located in the eastern Alborz (Elburs) Mountains range and the western edge of the Kopet Dag range. It comprises 91,890 ha.

Ecology
Golestan National Park has a variety of habitats, such as temperate broad leaf forests, grasslands, shrublands and rocky areas.  The diverse flora includes stands of white Eremurus kopetdaghensis, Iris acutiloba subsp. lineolata and Iris kopetdagensis.

The fauna is very rich and consists of Persian leopards (Panthera pardus ciscaucasica), Indian wolves (Canis lupus pallipes), brown bear (Ursus arctos), golden jackal (Canis aureus), wild boars (Sus scrofa), maral deer (Cervus elaphus maral), roe deer (Capreolus capreolus), urial (Ovis orientalis arkal), wild goats (Capra aegagrus) and goitered gazelles (Gazella subgutturosa).

Extinct

Iran's last known tigers had occurred in this area, before 1960.

See also
 
 Caspian Hyrcanian mixed forests
 List of national parks and protected areas of Iran
 Wildlife of Iran

References

External links 

National parks of Iran
Alborz (mountain range)
Biosphere reserves of Iran
Geography of Golestan Province
Tourist attractions in Golestan Province